Ingá is a municipality in the state of Paraíba in the Northeast Region of Brazil.

A notable landmark of Ingá is the Ingá Stone, a rock with huge pre-Columbian inscriptions which are still undeciphered.

See also
List of municipalities in Paraíba

References

Municipalities in Paraíba